Benty may refer to:

 Benty Grange helmet, a boar-crested Anglo-Saxon helmet
 Benty Grange, a Site of Special Scientific Interest in Derbyshire
 Benty, a town in western Guinea